The Philadelphia Flower Show is an annual event produced by The Pennsylvania Horticultural Society (PHS) and traditionally held in Philadelphia, Pennsylvania, at the Pennsylvania Convention Center in early March. It is the oldest and largest indoor flower show in the world, attracting more than 250,000 people annually. It has also been described as "the country's oldest, largest, and most prestigious celebration of flowers." 

The show features large scale gardens, which range from elaborate landscaped displays to individual and club entries of a prize horticultural specimen. Each year, the PHS declares an official theme. The exhibits are submitted for judging in many categories, and are highly competitive.

A popular part of the show floor is the Garden marketplace where visitors can buy plants and seeds, cut flowers, craft items, and other flower, landscaping and horticulture-related items.

The Show boasts fabulous floral and garden design, live entertainment, culinary events and extraordinary gardening how-to workshops and lectures by experts.  

The June 2022 event will feature 40 major exhibitors, featuring the theme "In Full Bloom."

In 2021 and 2022, the show was held outside in the summer at FDR Park due to the pandemic. It returned to the Convention Center in March 2023 with the theme "The Garden Electric."

Competitors 
The amateur division of the show known as the Competitive Classes often have an assigned theme, related to the overall show theme.  The 2007 Show, Legends of Ireland, featured Pressed Plant Material (i.e. dried flower pictures) that "incorporated a Celtic Knot."  The first weekend's Medium Niche theme was Wish You Were Here "Exhibitors will be sent Irish postcards for inspiration.  A copy of the postcard will be mounted next to the exhibit." Entrants for that class typically have a mockup of the niche at home, where they practice assembling and lighting their entry in the months preceding the show.  In a Challenge class, entrants bring only pruning shears, and must use show-provided materials to interpret a theme within a limited amount of time.  Three typical Horticulture classes are 142: Clivia, flowering. Pot 8" or under, 143: Clivia, flowering. Pot 8"-10", and 144: Clivia, foliage.  (There was also a Clivia entered in 2007 under Exceptional plants 10–20 years old, to be judged against “perfection” for their species/cultivar.)

Seth Pearsoll, PHS director of design, stated the desired type of Flower Show participants:We want designers who are firmly rooted in horticulture and great plant design, but who also are thinking about culture at large and how these designs relate to those issues. We want guests to be moved and delighted and to be changed, in some small way, by these gardens and the ideas behind them.

History
The international nonprofit organization Pennsylvania Horticultural Society was founded in 1827. The site claims the PHS "uses horticulture to advance the health and well-being of the Greater Philadelphia region," and that their programs "create healthier living environments, increase access to fresh food, expand access to jobs and economic opportunity, and strengthen deeper social connections between people."

In 1829, the first Philadelphia Flower Show was held in a Freemason building.The one-day exhibition showcased fruit, flowers, and plants. This included the poinsettia, a plant then-newly imported from Mexico, which was exhibited by Colonel Robert Carr. The Encyclopedia of American Folklife credits the flower show with introducing poinsettias as an American Christmas tradition, as the festival introduced the plant to hundreds of Americans.

There were no shows in 1917–18 nor 1942–45.

In 1925, the PHS joined the Florist Club, an association of local florist businesses. The 1925 show attracted 84,000 people. In 1927, Philadelphia Flower Show, Inc. was established; it assumed management of the Flower Show until the mid-1960s.

In 1964, Philadelphia Flower Show Inc. halted production of the show due to difficulty finding a suitable exhibition location. The show returned in 1966, moving to the now-demolished Philadelphia Civic Center, where it remained each year until 1996, when it moved to its present location at the Pennsylvania Convention Center. Today, PHS contributes to the local economy and the green life of Philadelphia and the region. Proceeds from the Flower Show support thousands of revitalization projects in communities. In recent years, a youth division was added to the pressed flower category, with the most recent winner being Kendall Wolson, a 17-year-old student from New Jersey who created a scene depicting two bears catching fish in a river.

In 1981, total attendance was 230,000; 210,000 were guests who had paid admission, and the rest were exhibitors, judges, PHS members, and the press.

The 2020 theme was "Riviera Holiday."

In 2021, the Philadelphia Flower Show was held outdoors at Franklin Delano Roosevelt Park in June instead of its usual location at the Pennsylvania Convention Center due to the COVID-19 pandemic. This was the first time the Philadelphia Flower Show was held outdoors. The 2022 show was also held at FDR Park. In 2023, the Philadelphia Flower Show will return to the Pennsylvania Convention Center and will be held in March.

Dates and themes 

Previous dates extend to 1829, but PHS did not record their dates and themes in the above listing. 

Historical art and photographs from 1829 to present relating to the PHS's Flower Show can be found on the Digital Archives of Pennsylvania Department of Education.

Gallery

References

External links

Philadelphia International Flower Show official site
Pennsylvania Horticultural Society

Culture of Philadelphia
Tourist attractions in Philadelphia
Flower shows
Annual events in Pennsylvania
March events
Recurring events established in 1829
1829 establishments in Pennsylvania
Agricultural shows in the United States